Ogresgals Parish is an administrative unit of Ogre Municipality in the Vidzeme region of Latvia.

References 

 

Parishes of Latvia
Ogre Municipality
Vidzeme